Real Men Cry is an album by roots music band Lost Dogs, released on BEC Records in 2001.

This was the first album by the Lost Dogs after Gene Eugene's death in March 2000 and is a tribute to him.

The song "Lovely Man" is not listed on the back cover of the CD. It was actually meant to go between the songs "Three Legged Dog" and "When The Judgement Comes," but was moved and drastically edited by the label, BEC Records. The label objected to the lyric "right by damn," and completely edited it from the recording on the final album. The song, in its unedited form, has only surfaced on CD once on a Paste Magazine CD sampler.

Track listing
 "A Certain Love" (Taylor)  (2:58)
 "Gates of Eden" (Taylor)  (5:08)
 "Real Men Cry" (Taylor)  (3:36)
 "Three Legged Dog" (Taylor)  (2:10)
 "When the Judgment Comes" (Taylor)  (2:40)
 "In the Distance" (Taylor)  (4:24)
 "The Great Divide" (Taylor)  (2:31)
 "The Mark of Cain" (Taylor)  (3:35)
 "Dust on the Bible" (Bailes)  (2:59)
 "Wild Ride" (Taylor)  (3:35)
 "Golden Dreams" (Taylor)  (4:51)
 "No Shadow of Turning" (Taylor)  (2:33)
 "Lovely Man" (Roe)  (3:45)

The band
Derri Daugherty — guitars and vocals
Mike Roe — guitars and vocals
Terry Scott Taylor — guitars and vocals

Additional musicians
Tim Chandler — bass
Frank Lenz — drums, percussion
Mike Knott — vocal on "A Certain Love"
Doctor Love — bass
Phil Madeira — pull-string Telecaster, B3 organ, accordion

References

Production notes

Lost Dogs albums
2001 albums
Tooth & Nail Records albums